Aroga gozmanyi is a moth of the family Gelechiidae. It is found in North Korea.

The wingspan is 14–16 mm. The forewings are covered with dark brown scales, with a yellow patch at three-fourths of the costa. The hindwings are grey.

References

Moths described in 1991
Aroga
Moths of Korea